Crack in the Ground is a volcanic fissure about  long
The formation of the fissure occurred approximately between 700,000 and 12,000 years ago.
Crack in the Ground marks the western edge of this small, volcano-tectonic depression. The crack is the result of a tension fracture along a hingeline produced by the draping of Green Mountain lava flows over the edge of upthrown side of the concealed fault zone. The fissure is located at the southwest corner of Four Craters Lava Field. Hikers can walk the length of the main crack and explore its tributaries.

See also
 Big Hole (Oregon)
 Hole-in-the-Ground

References

Geology of Oregon
Fissure vents
Landforms of Lake County, Oregon
Deschutes National Forest
Protected areas of Lake County, Oregon